San Isidro de El General Airport  is an airport serving the city of San Isidro de El General and Pérez Zeledón county, Costa Rica.

The airport is a public airstrip managed by the country's Directorate General of Civil Aviation (DGAC). 
The airstrip has no facilities.

Airlines and destinations
During late 2015, the domestic airline SANSA announced that there will be a scheduled service between San Isidro de El General Airport and San José.

Passenger statistics
These data show number of passengers movements into the airport, according to the Directorate General of Civil Aviation of Costa Rica's Statistical Yearbooks.

See also

 Transport in Costa Rica
 List of airports in Costa Rica

References

External links 

SkyVector - San Isidro Del General Airport

Airports in Costa Rica
Buildings and structures in San José Province